Michael Quinion (born c. 1943) is a British etymologist and writer. He ran World Wide Words, a website devoted to linguistics. He graduated from Peterhouse, Cambridge, where he studied physical sciences and after which he joined BBC radio as a studio manager.

Writer
Quinion has contributed extensively to the Oxford English Dictionary as well as the Oxford Dictionary of New Words (Second Edition, 1996). He has since written Ologies and Isms (a 2002 dictionary of affixes) and Port Out, Starboard Home: And Other Language Myths (2004), published in the US as Ballyhoo, Buckaroo, and Spuds: Ingenious Tales of Words and Their Origins

His most recent book is Gallimaufry: A Hodgepodge of Our Vanishing Vocabulary (2006). He wrote two books about orcharding and cidermaking, one titled Cidermaking (published by Shire Publications), the other, A Drink for Its Time, published by the Cider Museum in Hereford, where he served as curator.

World Wide Words
Quinion is the author and webmaster of World Wide Words, a site that documents the meaning and derivation of English language words and phrases. It covers a wide range of issues, including etymology, grammar, neologisms, writing style and book reviews. This site explores International English from a British viewpoint. The website features a large database of word-related topics, weird words, articles on word and phrase origins, and answers to questions from site visitors. It also offers a free weekly newsletter, which contains the latest additions to the database one week before they are posted on the website. The time delay allows for newsletter subscribers to respond with additional insights and comments, some of which may be included on the posted articles.

On 18 October 2014, Quinion announced that in future his newsletters would be published less frequently because writing a scheduled weekly newsletter had become increasingly arduous. In early 2017, Quinion sent out a message to newsletter subscribers stating that for unspecified personal reasons he was suspending publication of World Wide Words. Then on 4 March 2017, Quinion released to subscribers confirmation that the newsletter would be immediately permanently ended due to his personal circumstances as well as his own changing personal interests.

A recurring theme in Quinion's articles is the criticism of false etymology. Such popular etymologies often have the effect of obscuring the true origins of a word or expression by providing a misleading and often unsubstantiated story explaining its origin. Quinion's Port Out, Starboard Home (Ballyhoo, Buckaroo, and Spuds in the US) deals with many such etymologies.

Bibliography
A Drink for Its Time: Farm Cider Making in the Western Counties 1979
Cidermaking 1982, 2009
Ologies and Isms: A Dictionary of Word Beginnings and Endings 2002
Port Out, Starboard Home: And Other Language Myths 2004
Gallimaufry: A Hodgepodge of Our Vanishing Vocabulary 2006
Ballyhoo, Buckaroo, and Spuds: Ingenious Tales of Words and Their Origins 2006
Why is Q Always Followed by U?: Word-Perfect Answers to the Most-Asked Questions About Language 2009

Notes

References

External links
 World Wide Words
 Michael Quinion personal page

1940s births
Living people
Alumni of Peterhouse, Cambridge
Etymologists
Linguists from the United Kingdom
Date of birth missing (living people)
Place of birth missing (living people)
20th-century linguists
21st-century English writers
21st-century linguists
20th-century English male writers
21st-century British non-fiction writers
20th-century British non-fiction writers
20th-century English writers
21st-century English male writers